John Somers, 1st Baron Somers (1651–1716) was an English Whig jurist and statesman.

John Somers may also refer to:

John Somers (motorcycle racer) in 1963 Grand Prix motorcycle racing season
John Somers (sport shooter) (1874–1942), represented Great Britain at the 1912 Summer Olympics
John Patrick Somers (1791–1862), Irish politician

See also
John Somers-Cocks (disambiguation)
John Sommers, American football
John Sommers (minister) from Encyclopædia Edinensis

John Summers (disambiguation)